Nicholas Barnewall, 3rd Viscount Barnewall (1668–1725) was an Irish nobleman who fought for the Jacobites but afterwards sat in William's Irish Parliament. He was buried in a beautiful monument at Lusk.

Birth and origins 
Nicholas Barnewall was born on 15 April 1668 in Ireland. He was the eldest son of Henry Barnewall and his second wife Mary Nugent. His father had succeeded his grandfather as the 2nd Viscount in 1663. Nicholas's grandfather, also named Nicholas Barnewall, had been ennobled by King Charles I on 12 September 1645 for loyalty to his cause. His mother was a daughter of Richard Nugent, 2nd Earl of Westmeath.

Marriage and children 
Before Nicholas was of age, on 15 April 1688, he married Mary Hamilton, daughter of George Hamilton, Comte Hamilton, son of Sir George Hamilton, 1st Baronet, of Donalong, by his wife, Frances Jennings, who afterwards married Richard Talbot, 1st Earl of Tyrconnell).

 
Nicholas and Mary had three children:
Frances (died 1735), who married her distant cousin Richard Barnewall and was the mother of Nicholas Barnewall, 14th Baron Trimlestown
Henry Benedict (1708–1774), 4th Viscount Barnewall
George (1711–1771), who would be the father of the 5th Viscount

Career 
In 1688 he entered King James's Irish army as captain in the Earl of Limerick's Dragoons. After the defeat of the Boyne he was moved to Limerick; and being in that city at the time of its surrender, was included in the articles and secured his estates. In the first Irish Parliament of William III he took the oath of allegiance, but upon declining to subscribe the declaration according to the English Act of 1689, as contrary to his conscience, he was obliged to withdraw with the other Catholic lords. In February 1703, he joined with many Irish Catholics in an unavailing petition against the infraction of the Treaty of Limerick.

Death 
Lord Barnewall died 14 June 1725, and was buried in a beautiful monument at Lusk.

Notes and references

Notes

Citations

Sources 

  – Ab-Adam to Basing (for Barnewall)
 

 

1668 births
1725 deaths
Irish soldiers in the army of James II of England
Members of the Irish House of Lords
Viscounts in the Peerage of Ireland